Chathura Samantha (born 9 December 1987) is a Sri Lankan cricketer. He made his Twenty20 debut for Sri Lanka Air Force Sports Club in the 2014–15 AIA Premier T20 Tournament on 8 April 2015. He made his first-class debut for Sri Lanka Air Force Sports Club in Tier B of the 2017–18 Premier League Tournament on 19 January 2018.

References

External links
 

1987 births
Living people
Sri Lankan cricketers
Sri Lanka Air Force Sports Club cricketers
People from Southern Province, Sri Lanka